The 2016–17 Grand Prix of Figure Skating Final and ISU Junior Grand Prix Final took place from 8 to 11 December 2016 at the Palais omnisports Marseille Grand-Est in Marseille, France. Marseille was announced as the host on 27 October 2015. The combined event is the culmination of two international series — the Grand Prix of Figure Skating and the Junior Grand Prix. Medals will be awarded in the disciplines of men's singles, ladies' singles, pair skating, and ice dancing on the senior and junior levels.

Records

The following new ISU best scores were set during this competition:

Schedule
(Local time)

Thursday, December 8
 14:05 - Junior: Short dance
 15:20 - Junior: Men's short
 16:25 - Junior: Pairs' short
 17:40 - Junior: Ladies' short
 Opening ceremony
 19:45 - Senior: Pairs' short
 21:10 - Senior: Men's short

Friday, December 9
 15:45 - Junior: Free dance
 17:05 - Junior: Ladies' free
 19:05 - Senior: Short dance
 20:20 - Senior: Pairs' free
 21:45 - Senior: Ladies' short

Saturday, December 10
 14:00 - Junior: Men's free
 15:20 - Junior: Pairs' free
 16:45 - Senior: Free dance
 19:00 - Senior: Ladies' free
 20:20 - Senior: Men's free
 Awards ceremony

Sunday, December 11
 Gala exhibition

Qualifiers

Senior-level qualifiers

Junior-level qualifiers

Changes

Medalists

Senior

Junior

Medals table

Overall

Senior

Junior

Senior-level results

Men

Ladies
Evgenia Medvedeva set a new world record for the short program (79.21 points).

Pairs

Ice dancing
Tessa Virtue and Scott Moir set a new world record for the short dance (80.50 points) and for the combined total (197.22 points).

Junior-level results

Men
Dmitri Aliev set a new junior world record for the combined total score (240.07 points).

Ladies
Alina Zagitova set a new junior world record for the short program (70.92 points), for the free skating (136.51 points), and for the combined total (207.43 points). Anastasiia Gubanova set a new junior world record for the free skating (133.77 points) but Zagitova broke that record less than 10 minutes later.

Pairs

Ice dancing

References

External links
 2016–17 Grand Prix Final at the International Skating Union

Grand Prix of Figure
2016 in figure skating
Grand Prix of Figure Skating Final
ISU Junior Grand Prix
International figure skating competitions hosted by France
2016 in youth sport